The 1966 Idaho Vandals football team represented the University of Idaho in the 1966 NCAA University Division football season. The Vandals were led by second-year head coach Steve Musseau and played a second season in the Big Sky Conference, but remained in the NCAA University Division. Home games were played on campus at Neale Stadium in Moscow, with one home game in Boise at old Bronco Stadium at Boise Junior College.

Idaho nearly won the Battle of the Palouse with neighbor Washington State for the third straight year, but lost  in the chilly mud at Neale Stadium after giving up two late  It remains the last time the rivalry was played in the state of Idaho; the Vandals dropped fourteen straight to the Cougars until consecutive wins in 1999 and 2000.

McDonald rushed for 255 yards in the season finale against  and led the NCAA for the season with  He was the thirteenth overall selection in the 1967 NFL Draft, the highest-ever for a Vandal, taken by the Washington Redskins.

Schedule

Roster

All-conference
Fullback Ray McDonald was a unanimous selection to the all-conference team, joined by guard Steve Ulrich, center Bob Skuse, defensive end Tom Stephens, middle guard Dick Arndt, and linebacker  Second team (honorable mention) picks were guard Bob McCray, tackle Gary Fitzpatrick, tight end Tim Lavens, quarterback Steve Garman, defensive tackles John Daniel and Ray Miller, linebacker Jerry Ahlin, and defensive backs Byron Strickland and 

McDonald was a second-team All-American (AP, UPI, NEA), and a first team selection by the Sporting News

NFL Draft
Four Vandal seniors were selected in the 1967 NFL/AFL Draft, the first common draft, which lasted seventeen rounds (445 selections).

Three seniors were previously selected as future picks in the 1966 NFL Draft, which lasted twenty rounds (305 selections).

List of Idaho Vandals in the NFL Draft

References

External links
Gem of the Mountains: 1967 University of Idaho yearbook – 1966 football season
Go Mighty Vandals – 1966 football season
Idaho Argonaut – student newspaper – 1966 editions

Idaho
Idaho Vandals football seasons
1966 in sports in Idaho